Johan Fridolf Hagfors (11 March 1857–18 August 1931) was a Swedish newspaper publisher, music critic and composer, most known for having composed the two songs Modersmålets sång (The mother tongue's song) and  Ålänningens sång (Song of the Ålender). 

Born in Orimattila, he got a Cand.phil degree in 1881. In 1883 he became publicist of the small Åbo paper Turun Lehti which was published in Finnish but  at the same time Svecoman; it became the only newspaper with that combination to reach a wide readership. He also worked as a teacher in Åbo.

He composed several songs for male quartets.  Modersmålets sång was first performed in 1989 and is today considered an unofficial hymn for the Swedish-speaking population of Finland. Ålänningens sång, for which he composed the melody, was first performed during the song festival in Mariehamn in 1922 and is today the regional hymn for Åland.

In 1912 he became a member of the Royal Swedish Academy of Music.

Due to stiff competition, Turun Lehti ceased publication in 1919. Hagfors subsequently moved to Stockholm and obtained Swedish citizenship. He died in 1931.  Fellow composer Erik August Hagfors was his half-brother.

References 

1857 births
1931 deaths
Finnish composers
Finnish male composers
Finnish publishers (people)
Swedish-speaking Finns
National anthem writers